Delyan may refer to:

Places

Bulgaria
 Delyan, Kyustendil Province
 Delyan, Sofia Province

Other
 Delyan, Iran

People
 Peter Delyan (reigned 1040 - 1041), leader of a local Bulgarian uprising against Byzantine rule